Someday is a 2006 South Korean television series starring Bae Doona, Kim Min-jun, Lee Jin-wook, and Oh Yoon-ah. It aired on cable network OCN at 22:00 every Saturdays and Sundays, starting November 11, 2006, but on November 24, 2006, switched to 23:00 every Friday night.

Cast

Main Cast
 Bae Doona as Yamaguchi Hana
 Kim Min-jun as Go Jin-pyo
 Lee Jin-wook as Lim Seok-man
 Oh Yoon-ah as Jung Hye-young

Supporting
Choi Family
Yoon Won-suk as Choi Jae-deok (Seok-man's friend)
Lee Eun as Choi Yoon-deok / Sammy (sister)
Kim Mi-kyung as Ms Choi (mother)
Kang Shin-il as Mr Choi (father)

Other people
Jung Young-sook as Ha-na's grandmother
Ahn Yeo-jin as Sook-hyun (Ha-na's aunt)
Kim So-ra as Sachiko (Ha-na's friend, Sook Hyun's daughter, 22)
Shin Goo as Oh Bong-soo (Hye-young's boss)
Park Dong-bin as Hyung-in (Dr Go's friend, doctor co-worker)
Song Ji-young as Baek Eun-joo (Dr Go's nurse)
Oh Jung-se as Seo Jung-joon (private loan collector)
Ye Soo-jung as Gumiko (Ha-na's Japanese neighbor)
Jun Sung-hwan as Jun Young-gil (street cleaner)
Park Joo-hyung
Lee Moo Saeng

References

External links 
  
 

OCN television dramas
Korean-language television shows
South Korean melodrama television series
2006 South Korean television series debuts
2006 South Korean television series endings